Burstow may refer to:

 Burstow, a parish in Surrey, England
 Henry Burstow (1826 – 1916), British shoemaker
 Paul Burstow (born 1962), British politician